In English and British history, poor relief refers to government and ecclesiastical action to relieve poverty. Over the centuries, various authorities have needed to decide whose poverty deserves relief and also who should bear the cost of helping the poor. Alongside ever-changing attitudes towards poverty, many methods have been attempted to answer these questions. Since the early 16th century legislation on poverty enacted by the English Parliament, poor relief has developed from being little more than a systematic means of punishment into a complex system of government-funded support and protection, especially following the creation in the 1940s of the welfare state.

Tudor era

In the late 15th century, parliament took action on the growing problem of poverty, focusing on punishing people for being "vagabonds" and for begging. In 1495, during the reign of King Henry VII, Parliament enacted the Vagabond Act. This provided for officers of the law to arrest and hold "all such vagabonds, idle and suspect persons living suspiciously and them so taken to set in stocks, there to remain three nights and to have none other sustenance but bread and water; and after the said three days and three nights, to be had out and set at large and to be commanded to avoid the town." As historian Mark Rathbone has discussed in his article "Vagabond!", this Act of Parliament relied on a very loose definition of a vagabond and did not make any distinction between those who were simply unemployed and looking for employment and those who chose to live the life of a vagabond. In addition, the Act failed to recognise the impotent poor; those who could not provide for themselves. These included the sick, the elderly, and the disabled. This lack of a precise definition of a vagabond would hinder the effectiveness of the Vagabond Act for years to come.

Dissolution of the Monasteries

The problem of poverty in England was exacerbated during the early 16th century by a dramatic increase in the population. This rose "from little more than 2 million in 1485, ... [to] about 2.8 million by the end of Henry VII's reign (1509)". The population was growing faster than the economy's ability to provide employment opportunities. The problem was made worse because during the English Reformation, Henry VIII severed the ecclesiastical governance of his kingdoms of England and Ireland and made himself the Supreme Head of the Church of England. This involved the Dissolution of the Monasteries in England and Wales: the assets of hundreds of rich religious institutions, including their great estates, were taken by the Crown. This had a devastating impact on poor relief. According to the historian Paul Slack, prior to the Dissolution "it has been estimated that monasteries alone provided 6,500 pounds a year in alms before 1537 []; and that sum was not made good by private benefactions until after 1580." In addition to the closing of the monasteries, most hospitals (which in the 16th century were generally almshouses rather than medical institutions) were also closed, as they "had come to be seen as special types of religious houses". This left many of the elderly and sick without accommodation or care. In 1531, the Vagabonds and Beggars Act was revised, and a new Act was passed by parliament which did make some provision for the different classes of the poor. The sick, the elderly, and the disabled were to be issued with licences to beg. But those who were out of work and in search of employment were still not spared punishment. Throughout the 16th century, a fear of social unrest was the primary motive for much legislation that was passed by parliament.

Slavery law 1547

This fear of social unrest carried into the reign of Edward VI. A new level of punishment was introduced in the Duke of Somerset's Vagabonds Act 1547. "Two years' servitude and branding with a 'V' was the penalty for the first offense, and attempts to run away were to be punished by lifelong slavery and, there for a second time, execution." However, "there is no evidence that the Act was enforced." In 1550 these punishments were revised in a new act that was passed. The act of 1550 makes a reference to the limited enforcement of the punishments established by the Act of 1547 by stating "the extremity of some [of the laws] have been occasion that they have not been put into use."

Parliament and the parish
Following the revision of the Duke of Somerset's Act of 1547, parliament passed the Poor Act 1552. This focused on using the parishes as a source of funds to combat the increasing poverty epidemic. This statute appointed two "overseers" from each parish to collect money to be distributed to the poor who were considered to belong to the parish. These overseers were to 'gently ask' for donations for poor relief; refusal would ultimately result in a meeting with the local bishop, who would 'induce and persuade' the recalcitrant parishioners. However, at times even such a meeting with the bishop would often fail to achieve its object.

Sensing that voluntary donation was ineffective, parliament passed new legislation in 1563, and once this Act took effect parishioners could be brought by the bishop before the Justices, and continued refusal could lead to imprisonment until contribution was made. However, even this Act still suffered from shortcomings, because individuals could decide for themselves how much money to give in order to gain their freedom.

A more structured system of donations was established by the Vagabonds Act 1572. After determining the amount of funds needed to provide for the poor of each parish, Justices of the Peace were granted the authority to determine the amount of the donation from each parish's more wealthy property-owners. This Act finally turned these donations into what was effectively a local tax.

In addition to creating these new imposed taxes, the Act of 1572 created a new set of punishments to inflict upon the population of vagabonds. These included being "bored through the ear" for a first offense and hanging for "persistent beggars". Unlike the previous brutal punishments established by the Act of 1547, these extreme measures were enforced with great frequency.

However, despite its introduction of such violent actions to deter vagabonding, the Act of 1572 was the first time that parliament had passed legislation which began to distinguish between different categories of vagabonds. "Peddlers, tinkers, workmen on strike, fortune tellers, and minstrels" were not spared these gruesome acts of deterrence. This law punished all able bodied men "without land or master" who would neither accept employment nor explain the source of their livelihood. In this newly established definition of what constituted a vagabond, men who had been discharged from the military, released servants, and servants whose masters had died were specifically exempted from the Act's punishments. This legislation did not establish any means to support these individuals.

A new approach
A system to support individuals who were willing to work, but who were having difficulty in finding employment, was established by the Act of 1576. As provided for in this, Justices of the Peace were authorized to provide any town which needed it with a stock of flax, hemp, or other materials on which paupers could be employed and to erect a "house of correction" in every county for the punishment of those who refused work. This was the first time Parliament had attempted to provide labour to individuals as a means to combat the increasing numbers of "vagabonds".

Two years after the Act of 1576 was passed into law, yet more dramatic changes were made to the methods to fight vagabondage and to provide relief to the poor. The Act of 1578 transferred power from the Justices of the Peace to church officials in the area of collecting the new taxes for the relief of poverty established in the Act of 1572. In addition, this Act of 1578 also extended the power of the church by stating that "vagrants were to be summarily whipped and returned to their place of settlement by parish constables." By eliminating the need for the involvement of the Justices, law enforcement was streamlined.

End of the Elizabethan Era to 1750

Starting as early as 1590, public authorities began to take a more selective approach to supporting the poor. Those who were considered to be legitimately needy, sometimes called the "deserving poor", were allowed assistance, while those who were idle were not. People incapable of providing for themselves, such as young orphans, the elderly, and the mentally and physically handicapped, were seen to be deserving, whereas those who were physically able but were too lazy to work were considered as "idle" and were seen as of bad moral character, and thus undeserving of help.
Most poor relief in the 17th century came from voluntary charity which mostly was in the form of food and clothing. Parishes distributed land and animals. Institutionalized charities offered loans to help craftsmen to alms houses and hospitals.

Act for the Relief of the Poor 1597 provided the first complete code of poor relief, established Overseers of the Poor and was later amended by the Elizabethan Poor Law of 1601, which was one of the longest-lasting achievements of her reign, left unaltered until 1834. This law made each parish responsible for supporting the legitimately needy in their community. It taxed wealthier citizens of the country to provide basic shelter, food and clothing, though they were not obligated to provide for those outside of their community.

Parishes responsible for their own community caused problems because some were more generous than others. This caused the poor to migrate to other parishes that were not their own. In order to counteract this problem, the Poor Relief Act 1662, also known as the Settlement Act, was implemented. This created many sojourners, people who resided in different settlements that were not their legal one. The Settlement Act allowed such people to be forcefully removed, and garnered a negative reaction from the population. In order to fix the flaws of the 1662 act, the act of 1691 came into effect such that it presented methods by which people could gain settlement in new locations. Such methods included "owning or renting property above a certain value or paying parish rates, but also by completing a legal apprenticeship or a one-year service while unmarried, or by serving a public office" for that identical length of time.

The main points of this system were the following:
The impotent poor (people who could not work) were to be cared for in an almshouse or a poorhouse. In this way, the law offered relief to people who were unable to work, mainly those who were elderly, blind, or crippled or otherwise physically infirm.
The able-bodied poor were to be set to work in a House of Industry. All materials necessary for this work were to be provided for them.
The idle poor and vagrants were to be sent to a House of Correction or prison.
Pauper children would become apprentices.

During the 16th & 17th centuries, the population of England nearly doubled. Capitalism in the agricultural and manufacturing arenas started to emerge, and trade abroad significantly increased. Despite this flourishing of expansion, sufficient employment rates had yet to be attained by the late 1600s. The population increased at alarming rates, outpacing the increase in productivity, which resulted inevitably in inflation. Concurrently, wages decreased, declining to a point roughly half that of average wages of a century before.

"The boom-and-bust nature of European trade in woolen cloth, England's major manufacture and export" caused a larger fraction of the population of England to fall under poverty. With this increase in poverty, all charities operated by the Catholic Church were abolished due to the impact of protestant reformation.

Workhouse Test Act

A law passed by the British parliament and sponsored by Sir Edward Knatchbull in 1723 introduced a "workhouse test", which meant that a person who wanted to receive poor relief had to enter a workhouse and undertake a set amount of work. The test was intended to prevent irresponsible claims on a parish's poor rate.

The Industrial Revolution

Child labour

By the mid to late 18th century most of the British Isles was involved in the process of industrialization in terms of production of goods, manner of markets and concepts of economic class. In some cases, factory owners "employed" children without paying them, thus exacerbating poverty levels. Furthermore, the Poor Laws of this era encouraged children to work through an apprenticeship, but by the end of the 18th century the situation changed as masters became less willing to apprentice children, and factory owners then set about employing them to keep wages down. This meant that there were not many jobs for adult labourers. For those who could not find work there was the workhouse as a means of sustenance.

Gilbert's Act

The 1782 poor relief law proposed by Thomas Gilbert aimed to organise poor relief on a county basis, counties being organised into parishes which could set up workhouses between them. However, these workhouses were intended to help only the elderly, sick and orphaned, not the able-bodied poor. The sick, elderly and infirm were cared for in poorhouses whereas the able-bodied poor were provided with poor relief in their own homes.

Speenhamland system

The Speenhamland system was a form of outdoor relief intended to mitigate rural poverty at the end of the 18th century and during the early 19th century. The system was named after a 1795 meeting at the Pelican Inn in Speenhamland, Berkshire, where a number of local magistrates devised the system as a means to alleviate the distress caused by high grain prices. The increase in the price of grain most probably occurred as a result of a poor harvest in the years 1795–96, though at the time this was subject to great debate. Many blamed middlemen and hoarders as the ultimate architects of the shortage.

The authorities at Speenhamland approved a means-tested sliding scale of wage supplements in order to mitigate the worst effects of rural poverty. Families were paid extra to top up wages to a set level according to a table. This level varied according to the number of children and the price of bread.

New Poor Law of 1834

Indoor relief vs. outdoor relief

Following the onset of the Industrial Revolution, in 1834 the Parliament of the United Kingdom revised the Elizabethan Poor Law (1601) after studying the conditions found in 1832. Over the next decade they began phasing out outdoor relief and pushing the paupers towards indoor relief. The differences between the two was that outdoor relief was a monetary contribution to the needy, whereas indoor relief meant the individual was sent to one of the workhouses.

The Great Famine (Ireland)

Following the reformation of the Poor Laws in 1834, Ireland experienced a severe potato blight that lasted from 1845 to 1849 and killed an estimated 1.5 million people. The effects of the famine lasted until 1851. During this period the people of Ireland lost much land and many jobs, and appealed to the Westminster Parliament for aid. This aid generally came in the form of establishing more workhouses as indoor relief. Some people argue that as the United Kingdom of Great Britain and Ireland was in its prime as an empire, it could have given more aid in the form of money, food or rent subsidies.

In other parts of the United Kingdom, amendments to and adoptions of poor laws came in and around the same time. In Scotland, for example, the 1845 Scottish Poor Law Act revised the Poor Laws that were implemented under the 1601 Acts.

See also 

 Poverty reduction
 Alms
 Public works

References

1495 establishments in England
Welfare
Poor Law in Britain and Ireland